Irish Town is an unincorporated community in Butte County, California. It lies at an elevation of 2,270 feet (692 m).

References

Unincorporated communities in California
Unincorporated communities in Butte County, California
Irish-American neighborhoods